José Samuel "Samu" Martínez Lorente (born 15 April 1994) is a Spanish footballer who plays for Novelda CF as a midfielder.

Football career
Samu was born in Aspe, Province of Alicante. A product of local Elche CF's youth system, he made his senior debuts with the reserves in the 2011–12 campaign.

On 18 May 2014 Samu played his first match as a professional, coming on as a late substitute in a 1–3 La Liga loss at Sevilla FC. On 29 January 2016, he renewed his contract until 2017, being immediately loaned to CF Reus Deportiu in Segunda División B.

On 2 August 2016, Samu rescinded his contract with the Franjiverdes, and signed for Lorca FC the following day.

References

External links

1994 births
Living people
People from Vinalopó Mitjà
Sportspeople from the Province of Alicante
Spanish footballers
Footballers from the Valencian Community
Association football midfielders
La Liga players
Segunda División players
Segunda División B players
Tercera División players
Elche CF Ilicitano footballers
Elche CF players
CF Reus Deportiu players
Lorca FC players
CE L'Hospitalet players